The discography of American rock and roll icon Bo Diddley includes 37 singles, 24 studio albums, 24 compilation albums, 6 live albums, and several EPs. He has also appeared on 5 singles and 6 albums.

Bo Diddley only had one Top 40 hit on the Billboard Hot 100 and only one album charting on the Billboard 200, but Bo has achieved worldwide fame and respect as a member of the founding of rock and roll and has had his songs covered by many diverse artists.
He had 10 entries on the US R and B charts, and 2 more Pop hits, in 1963 and 1965, on the UK charts.

Studio albums 
All studio albums released as LPs, except † which were released as cassettes and ^ which were CDs.

{|class="wikitable"
! Title
! Release date
! Notes
! LabelCatalog No.
|-
| Bo Diddley
| 1958
| 
| ChessLP-1431
|-
| Go Bo Diddley
| July 1959
| 
| CheckerLP-1436
|-
| Have Guitar Will Travel
| January 1960
| named after Have Gun–Will Travel
| CheckerLP-2974
|-
| Bo Diddley in the Spotlight
| 1960
| featuring "Road Runner"
| CheckerLP-2976
|-
| Bo Diddley Is a Gunslinger
| December 1960
| #20 on the UK Albums Chart
| CheckerLP-2977
|-
| Bo Diddley Is a Lover
| September 1961
| 
| CheckerLP-2980
|-
| Bo Diddley's a Twister
| March 1962
| based on the twist craze
| CheckerLP-2982
|-
| Bo Diddley
| August 1962
| #11 on the UK Albums Chart, #117 on the Billboard 200
| CheckerLP-2984
|-
| Bo Diddley & Company
| January 1963
| first album with The Duchess
| CheckerLP-2985
|-
| Surfin' with Bo Diddley
| June 1963
| 
| CheckerLP-2987
|-
| Two Great Guitars
| August 1964
| with Chuck Berry
| CheckerLP/S-2991
|-
| Hey! Good Lookin'''
| 1965
| 
| CheckerLP-2992
|-
| 500% More Man| 1965
| 
| CheckerLP/S-2996
|-
| The Originator| December 1966
| 
| CheckerLP/S-3001
|-
| Super Blues| June 1967
| with Muddy Waters and Little Walter
| CheckerLP/S-3008
|-
| The Super Super Blues Band| February 1968
| with Muddy Waters and Howlin' Wolf
| CheckerLP/S-3010
|-
| The Black Gladiator| July 1970
| 
| CheckerLPS-3013
|-
| Another Dimension| May 1971
| 
| ChessCH-50001
|-
| Where It All Began| May 1972
| 
| ChessCH-50016
|-
| The London Bo Diddley Sessions| 1973
| 
| ChessCH-50029
|-
| Big Bad Bo| 1974
| 
| ChessCH-50047
|-
| 20th Anniversary of Rock & Roll| 1976
| 
| RCA VictorAPL 1-1229
|-
| Ain't It Good To Be Free †
| 1983
| Limited release recorded in Hawthorne, Florida and first home studio album since Bo Diddley Is a Gunslinger| BoKay069
|-
| Breakin' Through the B.S. †^
| 1989
| Home studio album recorded in Archer, Florida
| Triple X 51017
|-
| Living Legend| 1989
| Home studio album recorded in Archer, Florida
| New RoseROSE-118
|-
| This Should Not Be ^
| 1992
| Home studio album recorded in Albuquerque, New Mexico
| TripleX 51130
|-
| A Man Amongst Men †^
| May 21, 1996
| #8 on the Blues Albums chart
| Atlantic82896
|-
|}

 Compilation albums All compilation albums released as LPs, except † which were released as cassettes and ^ which were CDs. Live albums All live albums released as LPs, except ^ which were CDs. Singles 
{| class="wikitable"
! rowspan="2"| Year
! width="350" rowspan="2"| Titles (A-side, B-side)Both sides from same album except where indicated
! colspan="3"| Chart positions
! rowspan="2"| Album
|-
! width="45"| US Hot
! width="45"| US R&B
! width="45"| UK
|-
| rowspan="3"| 1955
| "Bo Diddley"b/w "I'm a Man"
|align="center"|—
|align="center"|1
|align="center"|—
|align="left" rowspan="5"|Bo Diddley (1958)
|-
| "Diddley Daddy"b/w "She's Fine, She's Mine" (Non-album track)
|align="center"|—
|align="center"|11
|align="center"|—
|-
| "Pretty Thing"b/w "Bring It to Jerome"
|align="center"|—
|align="center"|4
|align="center"|34
|-
| rowspan="3"| 1956
| "Diddy Wah Diddy"b/w "I Am Looking for a Woman" (from Bo Diddley's a Twister)
|align="center"|—
|align="center"|—
|align="center"|—
|-
| "Who Do You Love?"b/w "I'm Bad" (Non-album track)
|align="center"|—
|align="center"|—
|align="center"|—
|-
| "Cops and Robbers"b/w "Down Home Special" (Non-album track)
|align="center"|—
|align="center"|—
|align="center"|—
|align="left"|Have Guitar, Will Travel|-
| rowspan="2"| 1957
| "Hey! Bo Diddley"b/w "Mona" (from Have Guitar, Will Travel, as "I Need You Baby")
|align="center"|—
|align="center"|—
|align="center"|—
|align="left" rowspan="3"|Bo Diddley (1958)
|-
| "Say! Boss Man"b/w "Before You Accuse Me"
|align="center"|—
|align="center"|—
|align="center"|—
|-
| rowspan="2"| 1958
| "Hush Your Mouth"b/w "Dearest Darling"
|align="center"|—
|align="center"|—
|align="center"|—
|-
| "Willie and Lillie"b/w "Bo Meets the Monster" (Non-album track)
|align="center"|—
|align="center"|—
|align="center"|—
|align="left" rowspan="4"|Go Bo Diddley|-
| rowspan="4"| 1959
| "I'm Sorry"b/w "Oh Yeah"
|align="center"|—
|align="center"|17
|align="center"|—
|-
| "Crackin' Up"b/w "The Great Grandfather"
|align="center"|62
|align="center"|14
|align="center"|—
|-
| "Say Man"b/w "The Clock Strikes Twelve"
|align="center"|20
|align="center"|3
|align="center"|—
|-
| "Say Man, Back Again"b/w "She's Alright" [single version lacks album vocal overdub]
|align="center"|106
|align="center"|23
|align="center"|—
|align="left"|Have Guitar, Will Travel|-
| rowspan="4"| 1960
| "Road Runner"b/w "My Story" (on album as "Story of Bo Diddley"
|align="center"|75
|align="center"|20
|align="center"|—
|align="left" rowspan="3"|In the Spotlight|-
| "Walkin' and Talkin'"/
|align="center"|—
|align="center"|—
|align="center"|—
|-
| "Crawdad"
|align="center"|111
|align="center"|—
|align="center"|—
|-
| "Gunslinger"b/w "Signifying Blues" (from In the Spotlight)
|align="center"|—
|align="center"|—
|align="center"|—
|align="left"|Bo Diddley Is a Gunslinger|-
| rowspan="2"| 1961
| "Not Guilty"b/w "Aztec"
|align="center"|—
|align="center"|—
|align="center"|—
|align="left"|Bo Diddley Is a...Lover|-
| "Pills"b/w "Call Me" (Non-album track)
|align="center"|—
|align="center"|—
|align="center"|—
|align="left"|The Originator|-
| 1962
| "You Can't Judge a Book by the Cover"b/w "I Can Tell"
|align="center"|48
|align="center"|21
|align="center"|—
|align="left"|Bo Diddley (1962)
|-
| 1963
| "The Greatest Lover in the World"b/w "Surfer's Love Call" (from Surfin' with Bo Diddley)
|align="center"|—
|align="center"|—
|align="center"|—
|align="left"|Non-album track
|-
| rowspan="3"| 1964
| "Memphis"b/w "Monkey Diddle" (Non-album track)
|align="center"|—
|align="center"|—
|align="center"|—
|align="left"|Bo Diddley's Beach Party|-
| "Jo-Ann"b/w "Mama, Keep Your Big Mouth Shut" (Non-album track)
|align="center"|—
|align="center"|—
|align="center"|—
|align="left"|The Originator|-
| "Chuck's Beat" (with Chuck Berry)b/w"Bo's Beat"
|align="center"|—
|align="center"|—
|align="center"|—
|align="left"|Two Great Guitars|-
| rowspan="2"| 1965
| "Hey, Good Lookin'"b/w "You Ain't Bad" (from The Originator)
|align="center"|—
|align="center"|—
|align="center"|39
|align="left"|Hey! Good Lookin'|-
| "500% More Man"b/w "Let the Kids Dance"
|align="center"|—
|align="center"|—
|align="center"|—
|align="left"|500% More Man|-
| rowspan="2"| 1966
| "We're Gonna Get Married"b/w "Do the Frog"
|align="center"|—
|align="center"|—
|align="center"|—
|align="left" rowspan="5"|Non-album tracks
|-
| "Ooh Baby"b/w "Back to School"
|align="center"|88
|align="center"|17
|align="center"|—
|-
| 1967
| "Wrecking My Love Life"b/w "Boo-Ga-Loo Before You Go"
|align="center"|—
|align="center"|—
|align="center"|—
|-
| 1968
| "I'm High Again"b/w "Another Sugar Daddy"
|align="center"|—
|align="center"|—
|align="center"|—
|-
| 1969
| "Bo Diddley 1969"b/w "Soul Train"
|align="center"|—
|align="center"|—
|align="center"|—
|-
| rowspan="2"| 1971
| "The Shape I'm In"b/w "Pollution"
|align="center"|—
|align="center"|—
|align="center"|—
|align="left" rowspan="2"|Another Dimension|-
| "I Said Shut Up Woman"b/w "I Love You More Than You'll Ever Know"
|align="center"|—
|align="center"|—
|align="center"|—
|-
| rowspan="2"| 1972
| "Infatuation" b/w "Bo Diddley-Itis"
|align="center"|—
|align="center"|—
|align="center"|—
|align="left"|Where It All Began|-
| "Bo-Jam"b/w "Husband In Law"
|align="center"|—
|align="center"|—
|align="center"|—
|align="left" rowspan="2"|The London Bo Diddley Sessions|-
| 1973
| "Don't Want No Lyin' Woman"b/w "Make A Hit Record"
|align="center"|—
|align="center"|—
|align="center"|—
|-
| 1976
| "Drag On"b/w "Not Fade Away"
|align="center"|—
|align="center"|—
|align="center"|—
|align="left"|The 20th Anniversary of Rock 'N' Roll|-
| 1996
| "Bo Diddley Is Crazy"Also: "Can I Walk You Home""A Man Amongst Men"CD Maxi-Single
|align="center"|—
|align="center"|—
|align="center"|—
|align="left"|A Man Amongst Men|-
|}"—" denotes a release that did not chart.''

Appearances on albums

Appearances on singles

References 

Discography
Discographies of American artists
Rock music discographies